Slow Hands may refer to:
"Slow Hands" (Interpol song), 2004
"Slow Hands" (Niall Horan song), 2017

See also
"Slow Hand", a 1981 song by The Pointer Sisters
Slowhand, an album by Eric Clapton, 1977